FFZ or ffz may refer to:

Falcon Field (Arizona), an airfield in Maricopa County
Find first zero, a computer operation
Fujairah Free Zone, a free port in the United Arab Emirates